The 1997 Air Canada Cup was Canada's 19th annual national midget 'AAA' hockey championship, played April 22–27, 1997 at the New Glasgow Stadium in New Glasgow, Nova Scotia. The Thunder Bay Kings defeated the New Liskeard Cubs in the championship game to win their second gold medal in three years. The Calgary Royals won the bronze medal.

Teams

Round robin

Standings

Scores

New Liskeard 5 - Collège Charles-Lemoyne 2
Calgary 9 - Charlotteown 2
Thunder Bay 6 - Pictou County 3
Collège Charles-Lemoyne 13 - Charlottetown 1
Thunder Bay 6 - New Liskeard 3
Calgary 4 - Pictou County 4
New Liskeard 5 - Charlottetown 1
Collège Charles-Lemoyne 4 - Thunder Bay 1
Calgary 4 - New Liskeard 2
Charlottetown 5 - Pictou County 4
Thunder Bay 4 - Calgary 0
New Liskeard 8 - Pictou County 1
Collège Charles-Lemoyne 7 - Calgary 1
Thunder Bay 6 - Charlottetown 3
Pictou County 3 - Collège Charles-Lemoyne 3

Playoffs

Semi-finals
New Liskeard 4 - Collège Charles-Lemoyne 3
Thunder Bay 3 - Calgary 2 (OT)

Bronze-medal game
Calgary 3 - Collège Charles-Lemoyne 2

Gold-medal game
Thunder Bay 4 - New Liskeard 1

Individual awards
Most Valuable Player: Tim Zafiris (New Liskeard)
Top Scorer: Tim Zafiris (New Liskeard)
Top Forward: John Bistihas (Calgary)
Top Defenceman: Erik Adams (Thunder Bay)
Top Goaltender: David St. Germain (Collège Charles-Lemoyne)
Most Sportsmanlike Player: Derek Field (Pictou County)
Air Canada Scholarship: Tim Zafiris (New Liskeard)
Esso Scholarship: Vincent Blanchette (Collège Charles-Lemoyne)

See also
Telus Cup

References

External links
1997 Air Canada Cup Home Page
Hockey Canada-Telus Cup Guide and Record Book

Telus Cup
Air Canada Cup
New Glasgow, Nova Scotia
April 1997 sports events in Canada